Sohan halwa (Urdu سوہن حلوہ) is a traditional Mughlai dessert in South Asia, which is a variety of dense, sweet confection or halwa. Gheewala halwa is popular for sohan halwa since the Mughal era. There are hundreds of shops that produce sohan halwa in the cities of Multan (Punjab), Dera Ismail Khan (Khyber Pakhtunkhwa), and Old Delhi.

It is made by boiling a mixture of water, sugar, milk, and cornflour until it becomes solid. Saffron is used for flavoring. Ghee is used to prevent it from sticking to the pan. Almonds, pistachios, and cardamom seeds are added. Unlike most other halwa dishes in the Indian subcontinent, it is solid, similar to its Middle Eastern counterparts.

History

In Old Delhi, a 225-year-old Ghantewala sweet shop established during the reign of Mughal Emperor Shah Alam II, (r. 1759 - 1806)  in 1790, made sohan halwa, and was a popular attraction, but in 2015 it closed due to a lack of profitability.

This sweet was originally called Sohan in Khariboli (Hindi). The name is etymologically derived from the Sanskrit word Shobhan. According to John T. Platts' Dictionary of Urdu, Classical Hindi and English, the sweet was named after one Sohan Lal.

Commercial production
Sohan halwa has been commercially produced by traditional confectioners for decades. It is brittle and caramelised, usually made into discs of 5-6mm thickness or as square bite-size pieces. It is usually packaged in intricately designed tin cylinders. In recent years other packages have also been common.

See also
Baklava 
Basbousa 
Halva
Pişmaniye
Saray helva
Shekarpareh
Sohan (confectionery)
Soan papdi

References

Indian desserts
Pakistani desserts
Multan District
Pakistani confectionery
Economy of Multan